Apeiba albiflora is a tree which is often used as medicinal plant native to Amazon Rainforest vegetation in Brazil, French Guiana, Guyana, and Suriname.

References

External links
Virtual Tree Guide of the Guianas: Apeiba albiflora

albiflora
Trees of the Amazon
Plants described in 1922